Acrocercops syzygiena is a moth of the family Gracillariidae. It is known from South Africa.

The larvae feed on Syzygium cordatum. They mine the leaves of their host plant. The mine has the form of a large, irregular, semi-transparent blotch-mine, reddish-brown mixed with blackish above, the underside is brownish.

References

Endemic moths of South Africa
syzygiena
Moths of Africa
Moths described in 1961